) is a former Japanese mixed martial artist and professional wrestler of Korean descent. A professional MMA competitor from 1998 until 2012, he found success in Fighting Network RINGS, gaining notable victories over Valentijn Overeem, Alexandre Ferreira, former King of the Cage Light Heavyweight Champion Jeremy Horn, former RINGS Light-Heavyweight Champion Masayuki Naruse and former UFC Middleweight Champion Dave Menne.

He later competed for PRIDE Fighting Championships, DEEP, Pancrase and K-1 HERO'S to mixed success. Kanehara also once competed in professional kickboxing. Kanehara initially started his career as a professional wrestler and competed mostly in shoot style wrestling with UWF International and its successor Kingdom. He later made appearances for Pro Wrestling Zero1 and Real Japan Pro Wrestling before retiring in 2020.

Mixed martial arts career

Fighting Network RINGS
Kanehara debuted in RINGS with a submission win against Sander Thonhauser and followed it with a victory on May 29, 1998, against Lee Hasdell, winning by decision. He would follow with victories over Sander MacKilljan, Hans Nijman and Hasdell again, but his winning streak broke in February 1999 against Carlson Gracie apprentice Ricardo Morais. The 60 pound heavier Morais controlled Kanehara positionally with the aid of his size, leaving the Japanese relegated to try Kimura locks from underneath and trying to escape unsuccessfully.

On May 22, Kanehara faced Valentijn Overeem from RINGS Holland. Again facing a heavier opponent, Kanehara was hit with knees and kicks to the head and downed in the initial minute, but he managed to execute a takedown on Overeem, who fell badly and dislocated his knee. Judges and referee deliberated about letting the match continue after the knee was relocated, and they eventually conceded. Returning to action, Overeem landed a body kick which Kanehara grabbed for another takedown, but Hiromitsu fell into a guillotine and was forced to spend a rope escape. The sequence repeated itself before Overeem knocked Kanehara out with a high kick.

Kanehara had his debut in worldwide MMA at the 1999 edition of the King of Kings tournament, where he faced tough opposition. Kanehara eliminated Jeremy Horn in a prolonged grappling affair in the first round, winning the unanimous decision thanks to his superior wrestling and ground work, and then went to face eventual winner Dan Henderson. The match was harsh and brutal, with Kanehara getting his nose broken and finally being dominated with repeated takedowns for a majority decision loss.

After the tournament, Kanehara avenged his defeat to Valentijn Overeem, knocking out the Dutch fighter via punch from the clinch in a much shorter match. He was next sent as a RINGS representative to the event Colosseum 2000, where he found himself in front of Brazilian jiu-jitsu legend Mario Sperry; even at loss, Kanehara performed impressively, countering and escaping all the bad positions he was caught with by Sperry. Before the next edition of the tournament, Kanehara still fought the former finalist Renato "Babalu" Sobral, losing by decision.

Kanehara returned to KoK format facing popular luta livre practitioner and ADCC Submission Wrestling World Championship champion Alexandre "Cacareco" Ferreira. Although believed to be technically outmatched, Kanehara fought a long, strategic match and ended submitting the decorated grappler by kimura. He then won his next match, quickly knocking out Tommy Sauer with punches, and reached the tournament's final event. There, Kanehara fought and defeated another tough opponent in the form of Dave Menne, dominating the stand-up and knocking him out for a TKO win in round 3, although there was some controversy when Menne's corner protested the stoppage had been premature. Finally, Kanehara faced the eventual winner, Brazilian jiu-jitsu expert Antonio Rodrigo Nogueira, losing a very back and forth grappling contest when he was caught in a choke and forced to submit.

After his KoK tenures, Kanehara went to fight another Brazilian exponent and ADCC winner, Ricardo Arona, who he had already wrestled in ADCC in a losing effort. Though Kanehara was able to survive several striking combinations, holding his own on the mat, he was reversed in one of his own kneebar attempts and submitted. Right after he fought future Ultimate Fighting Championship welterweight champion Matt Hughes, losing by unanimous decision.

PRIDE Fighting Championships
At the twilight of his career, Kanehara debuted in PRIDE Fighting Championships as a RINGS veteran, and was pitted against a series of world-level opponents as PRIDE was known for doing with Japanese professional wrestlers. The first of them would be Wanderlei Silva in a challenge fight in PRIDE 23 for the PRIDE Middleweight Championship, but Kanehara was knocked down with strikes and hit with soccer kicks and stomps until his corner threw the towel.

Hiromitsu returned to PRIDE as part of the Bushido series, taking on another feared striker in Mirko Cro Cop. The match went to the judges this time, as Kanehara absorbed a surprising amount of punishment, including Mirko's dreaded left high kick. He got similar results against Alistair Overeem in PRIDE 28; he survived a barrage of punches, flying knees and even a German suplex-like takedown, until he was finished by doctor stoppage.

His final appearance in PRIDE was in its 29th event, being defeated by Maurício Rua via TKO (stomp) in the first round.

Championships and accomplishments
Fighting Network RINGS
2000 RINGS King of Kings Tournament Semifinalist
2000 RINGS Rising Stars Middleweight Tournament Semifinalist
Union of Wrestling Forces International
Junior League Tournament (1992)

Mixed martial arts record

|-
| Loss
| align=center| 21–27–5
| Yuki Kondo
| Decision (points)
| U-Spirits: U-Spirits Again
| 
| align=center| 3
| align=center| 5:00
| Tokyo, Japan
|
|-
| Loss
| align=center| 21–26–5
| Ryuta Sakurai
| Decision (unanimous)
| DEEP: Haleo Impact
| 
| align=center| 3
| align=center| 5:00
| Tokyo, Japan
| 
|-
| Draw
| align=center| 21–25–5
| Yuki Sasaki
| Draw (unanimous)
| Grabaka: Grabaka Live 2
| 
| align=center| 3
| align=center| 5:00
| Tokyo, Japan
| 
|-
| Loss
| align=center| 21–25–4
| Yusuke Sakashita
| Decision (unanimous)
| DEEP: Cage Impact 2012 in Tokyo: Over Again
| 
| align=center| 2
| align=center| 5:00
| Tokyo, Japan
| 
|-
| Draw
| align=center| 21–24–4
| Daijiro Matsui
| Draw (majority)
| DEEP: 57 Impact
| 
| align=center| 2
| align=center| 5:00
| Tokyo, Japan
| Light Heavyweight bout.
|-
| Loss
| align=center| 21–24–3
| Hideto Tatsumi
| Decision (unanimous)
| DEEP: 54 Impact
| 
| align=center| 2
| align=center| 5:00
| Tokyo, Japan
| 
|-
| Win
| align=center| 21–23–3
| Hiroki Sato
| Decision (unanimous)
| DEEP: 51 Impact
| 
| align=center| 2
| align=center| 5:00
| Tokyo, Japan
| 
|-
| Draw
| align=center| 20–23–3
| Yong Choi
| Draw
| DEEP: 49 Impact
| 
| align=center| 2
| align=center| 5:00
| Tokyo, Japan
| 
|-
| Loss
| align=center| 20–23–2
| Riki Fukuda
| Decision (unanimous)
| DEEP: 46 Impact
| 
| align=center| 3
| align=center| 5:00
| Tokyo, Japan
| 
|-
| Win
| align=center| 20–22–2
| Makoto Miyazawa
| TKO (punches)
| DEEP: 44 Impact
| 
| align=center| 1
| align=center| 0:25
| Tokyo, Japan
| Catchweight (87 kg) bout.
|-
| Draw
| align=center| 19–22–2
| Ryuta Sakurai
| Draw
| DEEP: 42 Impact
| 
| align=center| 2
| align=center| 5:00
| Tokyo, Japan
| 
|-
| Win
| align=center| 19–22–1
| Kenji Nagai
| TKO (punches)
| DEEP: 41 Impact
| 
| align=center| 2
| align=center| 3:02
| Tokyo, Japan
| Catchweight (85 kg) bout.
|-
| Loss
| align=center| 18–22–1
| Ichiro Kanai
| Decision (unanimous)
| Pancrase: Shining 8
| 
| align=center| 2
| align=center| 5:00
| Tokyo, Japan
| 
|-
| Loss
| align=center| 18–21–1
| Keiichiro Yamamiya
| Decision (unanimous)
| Pancrase: Shining 5
| 
| align=center| 3
| align=center| 5:00
| Tokyo, Japan
| 
|-
| Loss
| align=center| 18–20–1
| Izuru Takeuchi
| Decision (unanimous)
| Pancrase: Shining 2
| 
| align=center| 3
| align=center| 5:00
| Tokyo, Japan
| 
|-
| Loss
| align=center| 18–19–1
| Ryo Kawamura
| KO (punches)
| Pancrase: Rising 3
| 
| align=center| 3
| align=center| 1:36
| Tokyo, Japan
| 
|-
| Loss
| align=center| 18–18–1
| Marcelo Brito
| Technical Submission (armbar)
| MARS 5: Marching On
| 
| align=center| 1
| align=center| 0:49
| Tokyo, Japan
| Catchweight (85 kg) bout.
|-
| Win
| align=center| 18–17–1
| Ruslan Abdulkhamidov
| Submission (heel hook)
| Kokoro: Kill Or Be Killed
| 
| align=center| 1
| align=center| 2:02
| Tokyo, Japan
| Middleweight debut.
|-
| Loss
| align=center| 17–17–1
| Kestutis Arbocius
| Decision (unanimous)
| Pancrase: Blow 3
| 
| align=center| 2
| align=center| 5:00
| Tokyo, Japan
| 
|-
| Loss
| align=center| 17–16–1
| Chalid Arrab
| Decision (majority)
| HERO'S 2005 in Seoul
| 
| align=center| 2
| align=center| 5:00
| Seoul, South Korea
| Catchweight (90 kg) bout.
|-
| Loss
| align=center| 17–15–1
| Yuki Kondo
| Decision (unanimous)
| Pancrase: Spiral 8
| 
| align=center| 3
| align=center| 5:00
| Yokohama, Japan
| 
|-
| Loss
| align=center| 17–14–1
| Iouri Bekichev
| TKO
| RINGS Russia: CIS vs. The World
| 
| align=center| 1
| align=center| N/A
| Lithuania
| Heavyweight bout.
|-
| Loss
| align=center| 17–13–1
| Maurício Rua
| TKO (stomp)
| PRIDE 29: Fists of Fire
| 
| align=center| 1
| align=center| 1:40
| Saitama, Japan
| 
|-
| Loss
| align=center| 17–12–1
| Alistair Overeem
| TKO (doctor stoppage)
| PRIDE 28
| 
| align=center| 2
| align=center| 3:52
| Saitama, Japan
| 
|-
| Loss
| align=center| 17–11–1
| Mirko Cro Cop
| Decision (unanimous)
| PRIDE Bushido 3
| 
| align=center| 2
| align=center| 5:00
| Yokohama, Japan
| Heavyweight bout.
|-
| Loss
| align=center| 17–10–1
| Wanderlei Silva
| TKO (corner stoppage)
| PRIDE 23
| 
| align=center| 1
| align=center| 3:40
| Tokyo, Japan
| For the PRIDE Middleweight Championship.
|-
| Draw
| align=center| 17–9–1
| Mikhail Ilyukhin
| Draw
| RINGS: World Title Series Grand Final
| 
| align=center| 3
| align=center| 5:00
| Yokohama, Japan
| 
|-
| Win
| align=center| 17–9
| Paul Cahoon
| Decision (split)
| RINGS: World Title Series 5
| 
| align=center| 3
| align=center| 5:00
| Yokohama, Japan
| 
|-
| Win
| align=center| 16–9
| Kelly Jacobs
| TKO (lost points)
| RINGS: World Title Series 4
| 
| align=center| 2
| align=center| 1:51
| Tokyo, Japan
| 
|-
| Loss
| align=center| 15–9
| Matt Hughes
| Decision (majority)
| RINGS: 10th Anniversary
| 
| align=center| 3
| align=center| 5:00
| Tokyo, Japan
| 
|-
| Loss
| align=center| 15–8
| Ricardo Arona
| Submission (kneebar)
| RINGS: World Title Series 2
| 
| align=center| 2
| align=center| 0:53
| Yokohama, Japan
| 2001 RINGS Middleweight Championship Tournament First Round.
|-
| Loss
| align=center| 15–7
| Antônio Rodrigo Nogueira
| Submission (rear-naked choke)
| RINGS: King of Kings 2000 Final
| 
| align=center| 2
| align=center| 0:27
| Tokyo, Japan
| 2000 RINGS King of Kings Semifinals.
|-
| Win
| align=center| 15–6
| Dave Menne
| TKO (punches)
| RINGS: King of Kings 2000 Final
| 
| align=center| 3
| align=center| 3:24
| Tokyo, Japan
| 2000 RINGS King of Kings Third Round.
|-
| Win
| align=center| 14–6
| Tommy Sauer
| TKO (punches)
| RINGS: King of Kings 2000 Block B
| 
| align=center| 1
| align=center| 4:14
| Osaka, Japan
| 2000 RINGS King of Kings Second Round.
|-
| Win
| align=center| 13–6
| Alexandre Ferreira
| Submission (kimura)
| RINGS: King of Kings 2000 Block B
| 
| align=center| 2
| align=center| 2:45
| Osaka, Japan
| 2000 RINGS King of Kings First Round.
|-
| Win
| align=center| 12–6
| Josh Hall
| Decision (split)
| RINGS USA: Rising Stars Block B
| 
| align=center| 2
| align=center| 5:00
| Hawaii, United States
| 2000 RINGS Rising Stars Middleweight Tournament Quarterfinals; later pulled out of tournament.
|-
| Win
| align=center| 11–6
| Adrian Serrano
| Submission (armlock)
| RINGS USA: Rising Stars Block B
| 
| align=center| 1
| align=center| 2:07
| Hawaii, United States
| 2000 RINGS Rising Stars Middleweight Tournament First Round.
|-
| Loss
| align=center| 10–6
| Renato Sobral
| Decision (unanimous)
| RINGS: Millennium Combine 2
| 
| align=center| 2
| align=center| 5:00
| Tokyo, Japan
| 
|-
| Loss
| align=center| 10–5
| Mario Sperry
| Decision (majority)
| C2K: Colosseum 2000
| 
| align=center| 2
| align=center| 5:00
| Japan
| 
|-
| Win
| align=center| 10–4
| Valentijn Overeem
| KO (punch)
| RINGS Holland: There Can Only Be One Champion
| 
| align=center| 1
| align=center| 4:14
| Netherlands
| 
|-
| Loss
| align=center| 9–4
| Dan Henderson
| Decision (majority)
| RINGS: King of Kings 1999 Block A
| 
| align=center| 2
| align=center| 5:00
| Tokyo, Japan
| 1999 RINGS King of Kings Tournament Second Round.
|-
| Win
| align=center| 9–3
| Jeremy Horn
| Decision (majority)
| RINGS: King of Kings 1999 Block A
| 
| align=center| 2
| align=center| 5:00
| Tokyo, Japan
| 1999 RINGS King of Kings Tournament First Round.
|-
| Win
| align=center| 8–3
| Wataru Sakata
| Decision (lost points)
| RINGS: Rise 5th
| 
| align=center| 3
| align=center| 5:00
| Japan
| 
|-
| Win
| align=center| 7–3
| Masayuki Naruse
| Decision (unanimous)
| RINGS: Rise 4th
| 
| align=center| 3
| align=center| 10:00
| Japan
| 
|-
| Loss
| align=center| 6–3
| Valentijn Overeem
| TKO (corner stoppage)
| RINGS: Rise 3rd
| 
| align=center| 1
| align=center| 4:35
| Japan
| 
|-
| Loss
| align=center| 6–2
| Kiyoshi Tamura
| Submission (armbar)
| RINGS: Rise 1st
| 
| align=center| 3
| align=center| 0:14
| Japan
| 
|-
| Loss
| align=center| 6–1
| Ricardo Morais
| Decision
| RINGS: Final Capture
| 
| align=center| 5
| align=center| 5:00
| Japan
| 
|-
| Win
| align=center| 6–0
| Hans Nijman
| Submission (armbar)
| RINGS: World Mega Battle Tournament
| 
| align=center| 1
| align=center| 9:04
| Japan
| 
|-
| Win
| align=center| 5–0
| Lee Hasdell
| Decision
| NOTS 2: Night of the Samurai 2
| 
| align=center| 1
| align=center| 15:00
| England
| 
|-
| Win
| align=center| 4–0
| Dick Vrij
| Submission (armbar)
| RINGS: Capture '98
| 
| align=center| 1
| align=center| 4:22
| Yokohama, Japan
|
|-
| Win
| align=center| 3–0
| Sander MacKilljan
| Submission (armlock)
| RINGS: Fourth Fighting Integration
| 
| align=center| 1
| align=center| 3:26
| Tokyo, Japan
| 
|-
| Win
| align=center| 2–0
| Lee Hasdell
| Decision
| RINGS: Third Fighting Integration
| 
| align=center| 1
| align=center| 30:00
| Tokyo, Japan
|-
| Win
| align=center| 1–0
| Sander Thonhauser
| Submission (achilles lock)
| RINGS: Second Fighting Integration
| 
| align=center| 1
| align=center| 6:26
| Osaka, Japan
|

Kickboxing record 

|-
|
|Loss
| Changpuek Kiatsongrit
|UWF-i High Tension
|Tokyo, Japan
|Decision (unanimous)
|align="center"|5
|align="center"|3:00
|0–1
|-
| colspan=9 | Legend:

Submission grappling record
KO PUNCHES
|- style="text-align:center; background:#f0f0f0;"
| style="border-style:none none solid solid; "|Result
| style="border-style:none none solid solid; "|Opponent
| style="border-style:none none solid solid; "|Method
| style="border-style:none none solid solid; "|Event
| style="border-style:none none solid solid; "|Date
| style="border-style:none none solid solid; "|Round
| style="border-style:none none solid solid; "|Time
| style="border-style:none none solid solid; "|Notes
|-
|Loss|| Ricardo Arona || Points || ADCC -99 kg First Round || 2000 || N/A || N/A ||
|-

References

External links

 RINGS fight history

1970 births
Living people
People from Owariasahi, Aichi
Japanese male mixed martial artists
Sportspeople from Aichi Prefecture
Japanese people of Korean descent
Light heavyweight mixed martial artists
Mixed martial artists utilizing kickboxing
Mixed martial artists utilizing shoot wrestling
Japanese male professional wrestlers
Zainichi Korean people